Murtazin Khairulla Khabibullovich   (4 January 1941 – 17 November 2016) was a Russian mathematician. Since 1978 he has been the Head of the Chair of Mathematical analysis Bashkir State University.

Biography
Murtazin was born in the village Aznash in Uchalinsky District, now in Bashkortostan. He graduated from the Department of Mathematics of Bashkir State University and defended his doctoral thesis in 1994. Since 1978 until the present day he is the head of the Mathematical Analysis chair of the department

Scientific activity is devoted to problems of quantum mechanics.

Murtazin investigated the asymptotic behavior of the discrete spectrum of the Schrödinger operator, the spectrum of perturbations of partial differential operators, results on the two-particle operators in the class of integrable potentials, conditions for the existence of virtual particles 4. The results of the studies were used in the work on quantum mechanics, nuclear physics and acoustics, for geological and seismic work research and design institute of well logging VNIIGIS (Oktyabrsky, Republic of Bashkortostan).

Author of more than 50 scientific papers.

Works
 Spectral Asymptotics For Nonsmooth Perturbations Of Differential Operators And Trace Formulas. Akhmerova E.F., Murtazin Kh.Kh. Doklady Mathematics. 2003. Т. 67. № 1. С. 78–80.
 Trace Formulas For Nonnuclear Perturbations. Murtazin Kh.Kh., Fazullin Z.Yu. Доклады Академии наук. 1999. Т. 368. № 4. С. 442.
 Регуляризованный След Двумерного Гармонического Осциллятора. Фазуллин З.Ю., Муртазин Х.Х. Математический сборник. 2001. Т. 192. № 5. С. 87.
 The Regularized Trace Of A Two-Dimensional Harmonic Oscillator. Fazullin Z.Yu., Murtazin Kh.Kh. Sbornik: Mathematics. 2001. Т. 192. № 5. С. 87.
 Some properties of eigenfunctions of the schrödinger operator in a magnetic field. Gubaidullin M.B., Murtazin Kh.Kh. Theoretical and Mathematical Physics. 2001. Т. 126. № 3. С. 367–377.	
 Spectrum And Scattering For Schrödinger Operators With Unbounded Coefficients. Murtazin Kh.Kh., Galimov A.N. Doklady Mathematics. 2006. Т. 73. № 2. С. 223–225. 
 Асимптотика Спектра Оператора Штурма-Лиувилля. Муртазин Х.Х., Амангильдин Т.Г. Математический сборник. 1979. Т. 110. № 1. С. 135.	
 The Spectrum And Trace Formula For The Two-Dimensional Schrödinger Operator In A Homogeneous Magnetic Field. Murtazin Kh.Kh., Fazullin Z.Yu. Doklady Mathematics. 2003. Т. 67. № 3. С. 426–428. 
Неядерные Возмущения Дискретных Операторов И Формулы Следов. Муртазин X.X., Фазуллин З.Ю. Математический сборник. 2005. Т. 196. № 12. С. 123–156.	
Asymptotic Behavior Of The Spectrum Of The Sturm-Liouville Operator. Murtazin Kh., Amangil'Din T.G. Sbornik: Mathematics. 1979. Т. 110. С. 135.
Спектр И Рассеяние Для Оператора Шрёдингера В Магнитном Поле Муртазин Х.Х., Галимов А.Н. Математические заметки. 2008. Т. 83. № 3. С. 402–416.
Асимптотика Спектра И Формулы Следов Для Дифференциальных Операторов С Неограниченными Коэффициентами Муртазин Х.Х., Садовничий В.А., Тулькубаев Р.З. Дифференциальные уравнения. 2008. Т. 44. № 12. С. 1628–1637.
The Spectrum And The Scattering Problem For The Schrödinger Operator In A Magnetic Field. Murtazin Kh.Kh., Galimov A.N. Mathematical Notes. 2008. Т. 83. № 3–4. С. 364–377.
Губайдуллин М.Б., Муртазин Х.Х. Доклады Академии наук. 2002. Т. 382. № 3. С. 310.
Асимптотика Спектра И Формулы Следов Для Дифференциальных Операторов С Неограниченными Коэффициентами. Муртазин Х.Х., Садовничий В.А., Тулькубаев Р.З. Доклады Академии наук. 2007. Т. 416. № 6. С. 740–744.
Муртазин Х.Х. Известия Российской академии наук. Серия математическая. 1976. Т. 40. № 2. С. 413.	
Муртазин Х.Х., Амангильдин Т.Г. Математический сборник. 1978. Т. 110. № 1. С. 137.	
Губайдуллин М.Б., Муртазин Х.Х. Теоретическая и математическая физика. 2002. Т. 126. № 3. С. 443.	
Trace Formulas For Non-Nuclear Perturbations. Murtazin Kh.Kh., Fazullin Z.Yu. Doklady Mathematics. 1999. Т. 60. № 2. С. 206–208.	
Murtazin Kh.Kh., Amangil'din T.G. Sbornik: Mathematics. 1978. Т. 110. № 1. С. 137.	
Murtazin Kh., Yu. F.Z. Sbornik: Mathematics. 2005. Т. 196. С. 123.	
Quantum Defect For The Dirac Operator With A Nonanalytic Potential. Ishkin Kh.K., Murtazin Kh.Kh. Theoretical and Mathematical Physics. 2000. Т. 125. № 3. С. 1678–1686.	
The Classical Formula For The Regularized Trace Of A Multidimensional Harmonic Oscillator. Fazullin Z.Yu., Murtazin Kh.Kh. Journal of Mathematical Sciences. 2002. Т. 108. № 4. С. 608–633.	
Об Асимптотике Спектра Возмущений Дробных Степеней Дифференциальных Операторов. Муртазин Х.Х. Доклады Академии наук. 2008. Т. 419. № 2. С. 164–168.	
Асимптотика Спектра Возмущенного Оператора ЛапласаБельтрами На Трехмерной Сфере. Муртазин Х.Х., Атнагулов А.И. Доклады Академии наук. 2011. Т. 441. № 4. С. 442.	
О Полноте Волновых Операторов Для Оператора Шредингера Галимов А.И., Муртазин X.X. Вестник Башкирского университета. 2007. Т. 12. № 2. С. 3–4.	
Аналитическое Продолжение Решения Задачи Теории Рассеяния Для Оператора Шредингера С Магнитным Потенциалом. Галимов А.Н., Муртазин Х.Х. Вестник Башкирского университета. 2011. Т. 16. № 2. С. 322–325.	
Asymptotic Behavior Of The Spectrum Of Perturbed Fractional Powers Of Differential Operators. Murtazin Kh.Kh. Doklady Mathematics. 2008. Т. 77. № 2. С. 198–202.	
On The Properties Of Eigenfunctions And The Spectrum Of An Elliptic Operator. Gubaidullin M.B., Murtazin Kh.Kh. Doklady Mathematics. 2002. Т. 65. № 1. С. 44–46.	
The Asymptotic Behavior Of The Spectrum Trace Formulas For Differential Operators With Unbounded Coefficients. Murtazin Kh.Kh., Tul'kubaev R.Z., Sadovnichii V.A. Doklady Mathematics. 2007. Т. 76. № 2. С. 762–766.	
Spectrum Asymptotics Of A Perturbed Laplace–Beltrami Operator On A Three-Dimensional Sphere. Murtazin Kh.Kh., Atnagulov A.I. Doklady Mathematics. 2011. Т. 84. № 3. С. 824–825.	
Regularized Trace Of A Two-Dimensional Harmonic Oscillator. Fazullin Z.Yu., Murtazin Kh.Kh. Sbornik: Mathematics. 2001. Т. 192. № 5–6. С. 725–761.	0
 Non-Nuclear Perturbations Of Discrete Operators And Trace Formulae. Murtazin Kh.Kh., Fazullin Z.Yu. Sbornik: Mathematics. 2005. Т. 196. № 11–12. С. 1841–1874.	
Spectrum And The Trace Formula For A Two-Dimensional Schrödinger Operator In A Homogeneous Magnetic Field. Murtazin Kh.Kh., Fazullin Z.Yu. Differential Equations. 2009. Т. 45. № 4. С. 564–579.

References

 

1941 births
2016 deaths
Russian mathematicians
Soviet mathematicians
People from Bashkortostan
Bashkir State University alumni
Academic staff of Bashkir State University